Sajid & Zeeshan ( pronounced as "Saa-jid and Zeesh-shaan")  are a Pakistani electronic music duo from Peshawar, composed of Sajid Ghafoor (guitars and harmonicas) and Zeeshan Parwez (synths, laptops and FX modules).

Both members released their debut album through EMI in August, 2006 titled "One Light Year at Snail Speed" along with a video release of their fourth single from the album "Have to Let Go Sometime".

History

Sajid Abdullah, Zeeshan released their debut album titled One Light Year at Snail Speed through EMI Pakistan.

In 2008, Sajid & Zeeshan  performed at the Coke Studio Sessions with their song, "My Happiness", along with many other artists.

Band members
Sajid & Zeeshan
Sajid Ghafoor – vocals, harmonics, lead guitar (2003–present)
Zeeshan Parwez – keyboards, synths (2003–present)

Discography
Studio albums
One Light Year at Snail Speed (2006)
The Harvest (2011)

Singles
Freestyle Dive
Have to Let Go Sometime
King of Self
My Happiness
Lambay

Awards
Finalists in the "Song of the Year" contest for 2004.
The best "Foreign Language Song" category award at the 2nd Indus Music Awards.
The "Best Music Video" category award at the 1st Indus Music Awards for "Freestyle Dive".
Nominated at "The Musik Awards" for the "Best Video" category for "Freestyle Dive".
Nominated at the "Lux Style Awards 2006" for the "Best Video" category for "Freestyle Dive".

See also 
 List of Pakistani music bands

References

External links
Official Site
Sajid & Zeeshan Myspace

Musical groups established in 2003
Ambient music groups
Pakistani musical duos
Musical groups from Khyber Pakhtunkhwa
Pakistani musical groups
Pakistani electronic music groups